Union Township is a township in Hardin County, Iowa, USA.

History
Union Township was created in 1853.

References

Townships in Hardin County, Iowa
Townships in Iowa
1853 establishments in Iowa